Andreas Hofer is a 1929 German silent historical film directed by Hans Prechtl and starring Fritz Greiner, Maly Delschaft and Carl de Vogt. It is based on the story of the Tyrolean innkeeper and patriot Andreas Hofer who led an Austrian uprising against Bavarian and French troops during the Napoleonic Wars.

Cast
 Fritz Greiner as Andreas Hofer
 Maly Delschaft as Anna, Hofer's wife
 Carl de Vogt as Eisenstecken, Hofer's adjutant
 Rolf Pinegger as Gasteiger innkeeper
 Grit Haid as Moidl, Hofer's daughter
 Adolf Grell as Napoleon
 Georg John as Franz Raffl, a farmer
 Oscar Marion as Toni, a Sergeant
 Hermann Pfanz as Bernklau, a Colonel
 Max Reichlmair as Joseph Speckbacher
 Karl Reidlbach as Swet, Hofer's secretary
 Franz Stein as Father Haspinger

References

Bibliography

External links

1929 films
1920s biographical films
1920s historical films
German biographical films
German historical films
Films of the Weimar Republic
German silent feature films
Films set in the 1800s
Films set in the 1810s
Films set in Austria
Films set in the Alps
Napoleonic Wars films
German black-and-white films
Andreas Hofer
1920s German films